Kandibagh or Kindibagh is a village in Chaparhar District, Nangarhar province, Afghanistan.

History 
David Bivar speculates that the village might be the Kindi of Ghaznavid sources where Sabuktigin humbled Jayapala's forces and installed a ribāṭ of considerable fame. However, both the latitude and longitude are offset by about a degree when compared to Al-Biruni's records and the village has not been physically surveyed either to detect structural remnants that can be equated to the ribāṭ.

Notes

References

Villages in Afghanistan